Delia Sclabas (born 8 November 2000) is a Swiss athlete. She competed in the women's 800 metres event at the 2020 Summer Olympics.

References

External links
 

2000 births
Living people
Swiss female middle-distance runners
Athletes (track and field) at the 2020 Summer Olympics
Olympic athletes of Switzerland
Place of birth missing (living people)